Theophilus III served as Greek Orthodox Patriarch of Alexandria between 1805 and 1825.

References

19th-century Greek Patriarchs of Alexandria
1764 births
1833 deaths
People from Patmos